Carabayllo may refer to:
 Carabayllo District, Peru
 Roman Catholic Diocese of Carabayllo, Peru